The 1992 Tel Aviv Open was a men's tennis tournament played on hard courts that was part of the World Series of the 1992 ATP Tour. It was the 13th edition of the tournament and was played at the Israel Tennis Centers in the Tel Aviv District city of Ramat HaSharon, Israel from October 12 through October 19, 1992. Jeff Tarango won the singles title.

Finals

Singles

 Jeff Tarango defeated  Stéphane Simian 4–6, 6–3, 6–4
 It was Tarango's 2nd title of the year and the 2nd of his career.

Doubles

 Mike Bauer /  João Cunha Silva defeated  Mark Koevermans /  Tobias Svantesson 6–3, 6–4
 It was Bauer's only title of the year and the 9th of his career. It was Cunha Silva's only title of the year and the 1st of his career.

References

 
Tel Aviv Open
Tel Aviv Open
Tel Aviv Open